Jesse Michael Anderson (May 3, 1957 – November 30, 1994) was an American convicted murderer. He was murdered, alongside the serial killer Jeffrey Dahmer, by fellow inmate and convicted murderer Christopher Scarver at the Columbia Correctional Institution in 1994.

Early life
Anderson was raised in Alton, Illinois. When he was a teenager, his father died of a heart attack and his mother remarried. He attended Alton High School and graduated in 1975. In 1980, Anderson married Debra Ann Eickert and divorced in 1984. Also in 1984, he graduated with a degree in Business Administration from Elmhurst College. On March 30, 1985, he married Barbara E. Lynch in Chicago, Illinois.

Prior to his arrest for murder, the Andersons lived in Cedarburg, Wisconsin, with their three young children. He was treasurer of the Lions Club and did volunteer work at the Divine Word Catholic Church.

Murder of Barbara Anderson
On April 21, 1992, the Anderson couple went to a movie and dinner at a T.G.I. Fridays outside the Northridge Mall in northwest Milwaukee. After dinner, Jesse stabbed Barbara five times in the face and head, and then stabbed himself four times in the chest, though most of his wounds were superficial. Barbara went into a coma and died from her wounds two days later.

Anderson blamed two black men for attacking him and his wife. He presented police with a Los Angeles Clippers basketball cap he claimed to have knocked off the head of one of the assailants. When details of the crime were made public, a university student told police Anderson had purchased the hat from him a few days earlier. According to employees at a military surplus store, the red-handled fishing knife that was used to murder Barbara was sold to Anderson a few weeks earlier. Police stated that the store was the only one in Milwaukee that sold that type of knife. On April 29, Anderson was charged with murder. On August 13, he was found guilty and sentenced to life in prison with the possibility of parole after 60 years.

Death
On the morning of November 28, 1994, while imprisoned at Columbia Correctional Institution, Anderson and serial killer Jeffrey Dahmer were left unattended while cleaning a restroom at the prison gymnasium with fellow inmate Christopher Scarver. Scarver reported that he was "disgusted" by a newspaper report detailing Dahmer's crimes against black people, and had previously pleaded an insanity defense at his 1992 trial; when asked by  a psychiatrist whether he thought his sentence was just, he replied, "Nothing white people do is just". In a 2015 blog post, Scarver disputed some of these statements. After a confrontation with Dahmer and Anderson, Scarver retrieved a steel bar from the weight room, followed Dahmer to the locker room, and struck him on the head. He then tracked down Anderson and bludgeoned him as well. Dahmer was declared dead about one hour after the attack, and Anderson died two days later when doctors at the University of Wisconsin Hospital in Madison removed him from life support.

See also 
 Charles Stuart (murderer)

References

Further reading
 Davis, Donald A. The Jeffrey Dahmer Story: An American Nightmare.
 Mayo, Mike. American Murder: Criminals, Crimes and the Media. p. 96.
 Schultz, Ben. "They're Moving North": Milwaukee, the Media, and the Murder of Barbara Anderson.

External links 
 "Inmate Bludgeoned with Jeffrey Dahmer on Work Detail Dies" - The New York Times
 "Dahmer Slain in Prison. Anderson Seriously Hurt in Same Attack"  - The Milwaukee Journal

1957 births
1994 deaths
1992 murders in the United States
1994 murders in the United States
20th-century American criminals
American male criminals
American people convicted of murder
American people who died in prison custody
American prisoners sentenced to life imprisonment
Deaths by beating in the United States
Elmhurst College alumni
Jeffrey Dahmer
People convicted of murder by Wisconsin
People from Alton, Illinois
People from Cedarburg, Wisconsin
People from Wisconsin
People murdered in Wisconsin
Prisoners murdered in custody
Prisoners who died in Wisconsin detention
Prisoners sentenced to life imprisonment by Wisconsin
Racial hoaxes
Uxoricides
Crime in Milwaukee
Crime in Wisconsin
Criminals from Wisconsin
Criminals from Illinois
Murdered criminals